Yoğurtçular is a village in the central district of Şırnak Province in Turkey. The village is populated by Kurds of the  Şirnexî tribe and had a population of 700 in 2021.

The hamlets of Gözlüce, Ortaklar and Özveren are attached to Yoğurtçular.

References 

Kurdish settlements in Şırnak Province
Villages in Şırnak District